Lavik og Brekke is a former municipality in the old Sogn og Fjordane county in Norway.  It is in the present-day municipalities of Gulen and Høyanger in Vestland county. It was part of the traditional district of Sogn.  The  municipality was located along the Sognefjorden, at the western end of the fjord, just east of the mouth.  The municipality existed from 1861 until 1905. The administrative center of Lavik og Brekke was the village of Lavik.  There were two churches in the municipality: Lavik Church in Lavik on the north side of the fjord and Brekke Church in Brekke on the south side of the fjord.

Name
The municipality of Lavik og Brekke was named after the two municipalities from which it was formed.  Lavik was named after the old Ladvik farm, since Lavik Church was located there.  The first element comes from the Old Norse word hlað which means "pile" or "load".  The second element possibly comes from the Old Norse word víkr which means "inlet".  Brekke is named after the old Brekke farm since Brekke Church was located there.  The name is identical to the old word meaning "slope".

History
Lavik og Brekke was established as a municipality in 1861 as a merger between the municipalities of Lavik and Brekke, which were located along the Sognefjorden. Before the merger, Lavik had 926 inhabitants and Brekke had 898, giving the new municipality a population of 1,824.  On 1 January 1875, a part of Klævold municipality (to the west) with 90 inhabitants was moved to Lavik og Brekke.  On 1 January 1905, the municipality was split, reverting to their previous borders, leaving Lavik and Brekke as separate municipalities once again. Before the split Lavik og Brekke had a population of 2,164. Both Lavik and Brekke were later incorporated into other municipalities, with Lavik joining Høyanger and Brekke joining Gulen.

See also
List of former municipalities of Norway

References

External links

Gulen
Høyanger
Former municipalities of Norway
1861 establishments in Norway
1905 disestablishments in Norway